The girls' flyweight boxing competition at the 2018 Summer Youth Olympics in Buenos Aires was held from 15 to 18 October at the Oceania Pavilion.

Schedule 
All times are local (UTC−3).

Results

References

External links
Draw

Boxing at the 2018 Summer Youth Olympics